The 1991 430 km of Magny-Cours was the sixth round of the 1991 World Sportscar Championship season, taking place at Circuit de Nevers Magny-Cours, France.  It took place on September 15, 1991.

Official results
Class winners in bold.  Cars failing to complete 90% of the winner's distance marked as Not Classified (NC).

Statistics
 Pole Position - Yannick Dalmas (#6 Peugeot Talbot Sport) - 1:21.821
 Fastest Lap - Philippe Alliot (#5 Peugeot Talbot Sport) - 1:25.823
 Average Speed - 170.685 km/h

External links
 WSPR-Racing - 1991 Magny-Cours results

Magny-Cours
Magny-Cours